Zolotonoshka is a rural locality (a village) in Tyuryushlinsky Selsoviet, Sterlitamaksky District, Bashkortostan, Russia. The population was 563 as of 2010. There are 3 streets.

Geography 
Zolotonoshka is located 46 km southwest of Sterlitamak (the district's administrative centre) by road. Tyuryushlya is the nearest rural locality.

References 

Rural localities in Sterlitamaksky District